Albert Richardson may refer to:
Albert Richardson (architect) (1880–1964), English architect
Albert Richardson (priest) (1868–1905), English missionary to Africa and India
Albert Richardson (Wisconsin politician) (1864–1937), American politician
Albert D. Richardson (1833–1869), American journalist, Union spy, and author
Albert E. Richardson (inventor), English inventor who designed the first practical Teasmade
Albert F. Richardson (1868–1932), American law enforcement officer and politician
J. Albert Richardson (c. 1938–2002), trade unionist and politician in New Brunswick

See also
Bert Richardson (disambiguation)
Al Richardson (disambiguation)